Joshua Ryan Topolsky (born October 19, 1977) is an American technology journalist. He is also a record producer, and DJ under the stage name Joshua Ryan. Topolsky was the co-founder and editor-in-chief of technology news network The Verge, and a co-creator of its parent company Vox Media. Previously, he was the editor-in-chief of Engadget.

On August 4, 2014, Topolsky stepped down from The Verge and Vox Media to join Bloomberg "as the editor of a series of new online ventures it is introducing as part of a revamped journalism strategy". He left Bloomberg in July 2015 after clashes with Michael Bloomberg over the direction of its digital media strategy and started the digital news company The Outline.

Journalism

Between August 2008 and March 2011, Topolsky was the editor-in-chief of the technology blog Engadget. Since 2009, he has been the technology correspondent for NBC's Late Night with Jimmy Fallon, and then The Tonight Show Starring Jimmy Fallon. In March 2011, he resigned his position at Engadget.

Following his departure from Engadget, Topolsky began a new site called This Is My Next, a temporary home for him and his ex-Engadget colleagues as they built a new technology network. Like Engadget, the website included a wide variety of technology news, reviews, and editorials. The website name is a play on a phrase Topolsky often says when reviewing a device that he especially likes (e.g. "This is my next phone."). Topolsky's team at This Is My Next included former Engadget editors and contributors including Paul Miller, Nilay Patel, Joanna Stern, Chris Ziegler, and others.

On July 18, 2011, Topolsky announced on Late Night that he and his team were developing a new permanent network called The Verge. The Verge launched on November 1, 2011, with Topolsky as the founding editor-in-chief. He appears in many of the audio and video podcasts that the site releases as well as writing articles. He has appeared on Fallon's shows several times since the announcement of the site with products the site has reviewed that he showcases to the audience.

The New York Times reported on July 24, 2014, that Topolsky would be leaving The Verge on August 4, 2014, to pursue an editorial position at Bloomberg. The Times noted, "He will develop and run Bloomberg’s new ventures, which will cover specific topic areas such as politics and luxury."

The New York Times reported on July 10, 2015 that Topolsky would be leaving Bloomberg Business after clashes with founder Michael Bloomberg. This follows a radical redesign of Bloomberg Business web properties.

In April 2015, Topolsky started Tomorrow, a weekly podcast about current trends in technology, news, and culture. Each episode of Tomorrow features cohost Ryan Houlihan and a special guest, ranging from Google designer Matías Duarte to Topolsky's wife.

In 2016, Topolsky pursued initial funding for a new digital media outlet. The company is titled Independent Media and launched its first publication, The Outline, on December 5.

Music
Under the stage name Joshua Ryan, Topolsky was a well known trance music DJ whose tracks were included on several gold certified compilation albums. His tracks have been licensed by Palm Pictures, Moonshine Music, Ministry of Sound, and Sony Music Entertainment (UK). In 1999, Fragrant Records released his single "Pistolwhip", which was re-released on NuLife Recordings in 2001 and reached number 29 on the UK Singles Chart. Topolsky and his brother Eric Emm are known as the producing duo The Brothers.

Personal life
Topolsky lives outside New York with his wife, Laura June, who was also an editor at The Verge and now writes for various publications such as The Awl and Jezebel, and their daughter, Zelda June Topolsky. Topolsky was raised in a Jewish family.

Discography

Solo work
 "Hush" / "Doinyourheadin" - Slinkey Recordings 1997
 "Don't Look Back" - Slinkey Recordings 1998
 "Pistolwhip" - Fragrant Music 1999
 "Pistolwhip" - NuLife Recordings 2000
 "Thunderclap" - Fragrant Music 2000
 "Unreal" - Crush Recordings	2000
 "All" / "Ison" - System Recordings 2001
 "Buildings in Between" - System Recordings 2003
 "Buildings in Between" (remixes) - System Recordings 2003
 "By Design" - System Recordings 2003
 "Fury" - System Recordings 2003
 "Damage" - Alpha Numeric 2004
 "Blueness" - System Recordings 2005

Remixes
 Tanlines / Brothers (Joshua Ryan Remix)

See also
 The Outline

References

External links

Personal
 Personal website/blog

Journalism-related
 The Verge
 Topolsky's farewell note on Engadget, "Hello, I Must Be Going"
 Tomorrow Podcast

Music-related
 Official Website
 Discogs page for Joshua Ryan
 System Recordings
 British Hit Singles and Albums (Guinness 19th Edition)

1977 births
American electronic musicians
Record producers from Pennsylvania
American DJs
Living people
Musicians from Pittsburgh
Jewish American musicians
American male journalists
The Verge
Electronic dance music DJs
21st-century American Jews